Extratropical cyclones, sometimes called mid-latitude cyclones or wave cyclones, are low-pressure areas which, along with the anticyclones of high-pressure areas, drive the weather over much of the Earth. Extratropical cyclones are capable of producing anything from cloudiness and mild showers to severe gales, thunderstorms, blizzards, and tornadoes. These types of cyclones are defined as large scale (synoptic) low pressure weather systems that occur in the middle latitudes of the Earth. In contrast with tropical cyclones, extratropical cyclones produce rapid changes in temperature and dew point along broad lines, called weather fronts, about the center of the cyclone.

Terminology

The term "cyclone" applies to numerous types of low pressure areas, one of which is the extratropical cyclone. The descriptor extratropical signifies that this type of cyclone generally occurs outside the tropics and in the middle latitudes of Earth between 30° and 60° latitude. They are termed mid-latitude cyclones if they form within those latitudes, or post-tropical cyclones if a tropical cyclone has intruded into the mid latitudes. Weather forecasters and the general public often describe them simply as "depressions" or "lows". Terms like frontal cyclone, frontal depression, frontal low, extratropical low, non-tropical low and hybrid low are often used as well.

Extratropical cyclones are classified mainly as baroclinic, because they form along zones of temperature and dewpoint gradient known as frontal zones. They can become barotropic late in their life cycle, when the distribution of heat around the cyclone becomes fairly uniform with its radius.

Formation

Extratropical cyclones form anywhere within the extratropical regions of the Earth (usually between 30° and 60° latitude from the equator), either through cyclogenesis or extratropical transition. In a climatology study with two different cyclone algorithms a total of 49,745-72,931 extratropical cyclones in the Northern hemisphere and 71,289-74,229 extratropical cyclones in the Southern hemisphere were detected between 1979-2018 based on reanalysis data. A study of extratropical cyclones in the Southern Hemisphere shows that between the 30th and 70th parallels, there are an average of 37 cyclones in existence during any 6-hour period. A separate study in the Northern Hemisphere suggests that approximately 234 significant extratropical cyclones form each winter.

Cyclogenesis

Extratropical cyclones form along linear bands of temperature/dew point gradient with significant vertical wind shear, and are thus classified as baroclinic cyclones. Initially, cyclogenesis, or low pressure formation, occurs along frontal zones near a favorable quadrant of a maximum in the upper level jetstream known as a jet streak. The favorable quadrants are usually at the right rear and left front quadrants, where divergence ensues. The divergence causes air to rush out from the top of the air column. As mass in the column is reduced, atmospheric pressure at surface level (the weight of the air column) is reduced. The lowered pressure strengthens the cyclone (a low pressure system). The lowered pressure acts to draw in air, creating convergence in the low-level wind field. Low-level convergence and upper-level divergence imply upward motion within the column, making cyclones cloudy. As the cyclone strengthens, the cold front sweeps towards the equator and moves around the back of the cyclone. Meanwhile, its associated warm front progresses more slowly, as the cooler air ahead of the system is denser, and therefore more difficult to dislodge. Later, the cyclones occlude as the poleward portion of the cold front overtakes a section of the warm front, forcing a tongue, or trowal, of warm air aloft. Eventually, the cyclone will become barotropically cold and begin to weaken.

Atmospheric pressure can fall very rapidly when there are strong upper level forces on the system. These bombs rapidly drop in pressure to below  under favorable conditions such as near a natural temperature gradient like the Gulf Stream, or at a preferred quadrant of an upper-level jet streak, where upper level divergence is best. The stronger the upper level divergence over the cyclone, the deeper the cyclone can become. Hurricane-force extratropical cyclones are most likely to form in the northern Atlantic and northern Pacific oceans in the months of December and January. On 14 and 15 December 1986, an extratropical cyclone near Iceland deepened to below , which is a pressure equivalent to a category 5 hurricane. In the Arctic, the average pressure for cyclones is  during the winter, and  during the summer.

Extratropical transition

Tropical cyclones often transform into extratropical cyclones at the end of their tropical existence, usually between 30° and 40° latitude, where there is sufficient forcing from upper-level troughs or shortwaves riding the Westerlies for the process of extratropical transition to begin. During this process, a cyclone in extratropical transition (known across the eastern North Pacific and North Atlantic oceans as the post-tropical stage), will invariably form or connect with nearby fronts and/or troughs consistent with a baroclinic system. Due to this, the size of the system will usually appear to increase, while the core weakens. However, after transition is complete, the storm may re-strengthen due to baroclinic energy, depending on the environmental conditions surrounding the system. The cyclone will also distort in shape, becoming less symmetric with time.

During extratropical transition, the cyclone begins to tilt back into the colder airmass with height, and the cyclone's primary energy source converts from the release of latent heat from condensation (from thunderstorms near the center) to baroclinic processes. The low pressure system eventually loses its warm core and becomes a cold-core system.

The peak time of subtropical cyclogenesis (the midpoint of this transition) in the North Atlantic is in the months of September and October, when the difference between the temperature of the air aloft and the sea surface temperature is the greatest, leading to the greatest potential for instability. On rare occasions, an extratropical cyclone can transit into a tropical cyclone if it reaches an area of ocean with warmer waters and an environment with less vertical wind shear. An example of this happening is in the 1991 Perfect Storm. The process known as "tropical transition" involves the usually slow development of an extratropically cold core vortex into a tropical cyclone.

The Joint Typhoon Warning Center uses the extratropical transition (XT) technique to subjectively estimate the intensity of tropical cyclones becoming extratropical based on visible and infrared satellite imagery. Loss of central convection in transitioning tropical cyclones can cause the Dvorak technique to fail; the loss of convection results in unrealistically low estimates using the Dvorak technique. The system combines aspects of the Dvorak technique, used for estimating tropical cyclone intensity, and the Hebert-Poteat technique, used for estimating subtropical cyclone intensity. The technique is applied when a tropical cyclone interacts with a frontal boundary or loses its central convection while maintaining its forward speed or accelerating. The XT scale corresponds to the Dvorak scale and is applied in the same way, except that "XT" is used instead of "T" to indicate that the system is undergoing extratropical transition. Also, the XT technique is only used once extratropical transition begins; the Dvorak technique is still used if the system begins dissipating without transition. Once the cyclone has completed transition and become cold-core, the technique is no longer used.

Structure

Surface pressure and wind distribution 
The windfield of an extratropical cyclone constricts with distance in relation to surface level pressure, with the lowest pressure being found near the center, and the highest winds typically just on the cold/poleward side of warm fronts, occlusions, and cold fronts, where the pressure gradient force is highest. The area poleward and west of the cold and warm fronts connected to extratropical cyclones is known as the cold sector, while the area equatorward and east of its associated cold and warm fronts is known as the warm sector.

The wind flow around an extratropical cyclone is counterclockwise in the northern hemisphere, and clockwise in the southern hemisphere, due to the Coriolis effect (this manner of rotation is generally referred to as cyclonic). Near this center, the pressure gradient force (from the pressure at the center of the cyclone compared to the pressure outside the cyclone) and the Coriolis force must be in an approximate balance for the cyclone to avoid collapsing in on itself as a result of the difference in pressure. The central pressure of the cyclone will lower with increasing maturity, while outside of the cyclone, the sea-level pressure is about average. In most extratropical cyclones, the part of the cold front ahead of the cyclone will develop into a warm front, giving the frontal zone (as drawn on surface weather maps) a wave-like shape. Due to their appearance on satellite images, extratropical cyclones can also be referred to as frontal waves early in their life cycle. In the United States, an old name for such a system is "warm wave".

In the northern hemisphere, once a cyclone occludes, a trough of warm air aloft—or "trowal" for short—will be caused by strong southerly winds on its eastern periphery rotating aloft around its northeast, and ultimately into its northwestern periphery (also known as the warm conveyor belt), forcing a surface trough to continue into the cold sector on a similar curve to the occluded front. The trowal creates the portion of an occluded cyclone known as its comma head, due to the comma-like shape of the mid-tropospheric cloudiness that accompanies the feature. It can also be the focus of locally heavy precipitation, with thunderstorms possible if the atmosphere along the trowal is unstable enough for convection.

Vertical structure
Extratropical cyclones slant back into colder air masses and strengthen with height, sometimes exceeding 30,000 feet (approximately 9 km) in depth.
Above the surface of the earth, the air temperature near the center of the cyclone is increasingly colder than the surrounding environment. These characteristics are the direct opposite of those found in their counterparts, tropical cyclones; thus, they are sometimes called "cold-core lows". Various charts can be examined to check the characteristics of a cold-core system with height, such as the  chart, which is at about  altitude. Cyclone phase diagrams are used to tell whether a cyclone is tropical, subtropical, or extratropical.

Cyclone evolution

There are two models of cyclone development and life cycles in common use: the Norwegian model and the Shapiro–Keyser model.

Norwegian cyclone model

Of the two theories on extratropical cyclone structure and life cycle, the older is the Norwegian Cyclone Model, developed during World War I. In this theory, cyclones develop as they move up and along a frontal boundary, eventually occluding and reaching a barotropically cold environment. It was developed completely from surface-based weather observations, including descriptions of clouds found near frontal boundaries. This theory still retains merit, as it is a good description for extratropical cyclones over continental landmasses.

Shapiro–Keyser model
A second competing theory for extratropical cyclone development over the oceans is the Shapiro–Keyser model, developed in 1990. Its main differences with the Norwegian Cyclone Model are the fracture of the cold front, treating warm-type occlusions and warm fronts as the same, and allowing the cold front to progress through the warm sector perpendicular to the warm front. This model was based on oceanic cyclones and their frontal structure, as seen in surface observations and in previous projects which used aircraft to determine the vertical structure of fronts across the northwest Atlantic.

Warm seclusion
A warm seclusion is the mature phase of the extratropical cyclone life cycle. This was conceptualized after the ERICA field experiment of the late 1980s, which produced observations of intense marine cyclones that indicated an anomalously warm low-level thermal structure, secluded (or surrounded) by a bent-back warm front and a coincident chevron-shaped band of intense surface winds. The Norwegian Cyclone Model, as developed by the Bergen School of Meteorology, largely observed cyclones at the tail end of their lifecycle and used the term occlusion to identify the decaying stages.

Warm seclusions may have cloud-free, eye-like features at their center (reminiscent of tropical cyclones), significant pressure falls, hurricane-force winds, and moderate to strong convection. The most intense warm seclusions often attain pressures less than 950 millibars (28.05 inHg) with a definitive lower to mid-level warm core structure. A warm seclusion, the result of a baroclinic lifecycle, occurs at latitudes well poleward of the tropics.

As latent heat flux releases are important for their development and intensification, most warm seclusion events occur over the oceans; they may impact coastal nations with hurricane force winds and torrential rain. Climatologically, the Northern Hemisphere sees warm seclusions during the cold season months, while the Southern Hemisphere may see a strong cyclone event such as this during all times of the year.

In all tropical basins, except the Northern Indian Ocean, the extratropical transition of a tropical cyclone may result in reintensification into a warm seclusion. For example, Hurricane Maria (2005) and Hurricane Cristobal (2014) each re-intensified into a strong baroclinic system and achieved warm seclusion status at maturity (or lowest pressure).

Motion

Extratropical cyclones are generally driven, or "steered", by deep westerly winds in a general west to east motion across both the Northern and Southern hemispheres of the Earth. This general motion of atmospheric flow is known as "zonal". Where this general trend is the main steering influence of an extratropical cyclone, it is known as a "zonal flow regime".

When the general flow pattern buckles from a zonal pattern to the meridional pattern, a slower movement in a north or southward direction is more likely. Meridional flow patterns feature strong, amplified troughs and ridges, generally with more northerly and southerly flow.

Changes in direction of this nature are most commonly observed as a result of a cyclone's interaction with other low pressure systems, troughs, ridges, or with anticyclones. A strong and stationary anticyclone can effectively block the path of an extratropical cyclone. Such blocking patterns are quite normal, and will generally result in a weakening of the cyclone, the weakening of the anticyclone, a diversion of the cyclone towards the anticyclone's periphery, or a combination of all three to some extent depending on the precise conditions. It is also common for an extratropical cyclone to strengthen as the blocking anticyclone or ridge weakens in these circumstances.

Where an extratropical cyclone encounters another extratropical cyclone (or almost any other kind of cyclonic vortex in the atmosphere), the two may combine to become a binary cyclone, where the vortices of the two cyclones rotate around each other (known as the "Fujiwhara effect"). This most often results in a merging of the two low pressure systems into a single extratropical cyclone, or can less commonly result in a mere change of direction of either one or both of the cyclones. The precise results of such interactions depend on factors such as the size of the two cyclones, their strength, their distance from each other, and the prevailing atmospheric conditions around them.

Effects

General
The band of precipitation that is associated with the warm front is often extensive. In mature extratropical cyclones, an area known as the comma head on the northwest periphery of the surface low can be a region of heavy precipitation, frequent thunderstorms, and thundersnows. Cyclones tend to move along a predictable path at a moderate rate of progress. During fall, winter, and spring, the atmosphere over continents can be cold enough through the depth of the troposphere to cause snowfall.

Severe weather
Squall lines, or solid bands of strong thunderstorms, can form ahead of cold fronts and lee troughs due to the presence of significant atmospheric moisture and strong upper level divergence, leading to hail and high winds. When significant directional wind shear exists in the atmosphere ahead of a cold front in the presence of a strong upper-level jet stream, tornado formation is possible. Although tornadoes can form anywhere on Earth, the greatest number occur in the Great Plains in the United States, because downsloped winds off the north–south oriented Rocky Mountains, which can form a dry line, aid their development at any strength.

Explosive development of extratropical cyclones can be sudden.

Although most tropical cyclones that become extratropical quickly dissipate or are absorbed by another weather system, they can still retain winds of hurricane or gale force. In 1954, Hurricane Hazel became extratropical over North Carolina as a strong Category 3 storm. The Columbus Day Storm of 1962, which evolved from the remains of Typhoon Freda, caused heavy damage in Oregon and Washington, with widespread damage equivalent to at least a Category 3. In 2005, Hurricane Wilma began to lose tropical characteristics while still sporting Category 3-force winds (and became fully extratropical as a Category 1 storm).

In summer, extratropical cyclones are generally weak, but some of the systems can cause significant floods overland because of torrential rainfall. The July 2016 North China cyclone never brought gale-force sustained winds, but it caused devastating floods in mainland China, resulting in at least 184 deaths and ¥33.19 billion (US$4.96 billion) of damage.

An emerging topic is the co-occurrence of wind and precipitation extremes, so-called compound extreme events, induced by extratropical cyclones. Such compound events account for 3–5% of the total number of cyclones.

Climate and general circulation
In the classic analysis by Edward Lorenz (the Lorenz energy cycle), extratropical cyclones (so-called atmospheric transients) acts as a mechanism in converting potential energy that is created by pole to equator temperature gradients to eddy kinetic energy. In the process, the pole-equator temperature gradient is reduced (i.e. energy is transported poleward to warm up the higher latitudes).

The existence of such transients are also closely related to the formation of the Icelandic and Aleutian Low — the two most prominent general circulation features in the mid- to sub-polar northern latitudes. The two lows are formed by both the transport of kinetic energy and the latent heating (the energy released when water phase changed from vapor to liquid during precipitation) from the extratropical cyclones.

Historic storms

The Great Storm of 1703 was a particularly violent cyclone, being one of the most severe storms in British history. It has been estimated that wind gusts reached at least . 

A violent storm during the Crimean War on November 14, 1854, wrecked 30 vessels, and sparked investigations into meteorology and forecasting in Europe. 

The "Wahine storm" was an extratropical cyclone that struck Wellington, New Zealand on April 10, 1968, so named after causing the inter-island ferry  to strike a reef and founder at the entrance to Wellington Harbour, resulting in 53 deaths. 

On November 10, 1975, an extratropical storm on Lake Superior contributed to the sinking of the  near the Canada–US border, 15 NM northwest of the entrance to Whitefish Bay. A rapidly strengthening storm struck Vancouver Island on October 11, 1984, and inspired the development of moored buoys off the western coast of Canada. 

In the Southern Hemisphere, a violent extratropical storm hit Uruguay on August 23–24, 2005, killing 10 people. The system's winds exceeded  while Montevideo, the country's capital with 1.5 million inhabitants, was affected by tropical storm-force winds for over 12 hours and by hurricane-force winds for nearly four hours. Extratropical cyclones are common in this part of the globe during fall, winter and spring months.

In 2018, in Italy, the Vaia Storm, causes frequent gusts of around 55 kn the whole peninsula with peaks of 128 kn in the alpine areas, leading to the fall of 14 million trees.

In 2022, Hurricane Fiona transitioned into a post-tropical cyclone on the night of September 23, and became the most intense and costliest post-tropical cyclone to hit Canada on record.

See also

Nor'easter
Sudestada
Cyclogenesis

References

External links

 
Articles containing video clips